Mohni Village is located near by Surat about 17 km and very close to the Chalthan.

Villages in Surat district